Tales from the Empire (1997) is an anthology of short stories set in the fictional Star Wars universe. The book is edited by Peter Schweighofer.

The centerpoint of the anthology is a short novel by Timothy Zahn and Michael A. Stackpole entitled "Side Trip". The short novel centers on two smugglers, Captain Haber Trell and Maranne Darmic. It features such prominent characters as Grand Admiral Thrawn, Hal and Corran Horn, Zekka Thyne, and Kirtan Loor.

Contents 
 "First Contact" by Timothy Zahn (7 ABY)
 "Tinian on Trial" by Kathy Tyers (2 BBY)
 "The Final Exit" by Patricia A. Jackson (11 BBY)
 "Missed Chance" by Michael A. Stackpole (6 ABY)
 "Retreat From Coruscant" by Laurie Burns (8 ABY)
 "A Certain Point of View" by Charlene Newcomb (0 ABY)
 "Blaze of Glory" by Tony Russo (11 ABY)
 "Slaying Dragons" by Angela Phillips (3 ABY)
 "Do No Harm" by Erin Endom (3 BBY)
 "Side Trip" by Timothy Zahn and Michael A. Stackpole (2 ABY)

References

External links
Official CargoBay Listing

1997 anthologies
Star Wars Legends
Science fiction anthologies
Bantam Spectra books